The DRB Class 50 is a German class of 2-10-0 locomotive, built from 1939 as a standard locomotive (Einheitsdampflokomotive) for hauling goods trains. It had one leading axle and five coupled axles and was one of the most successful designs produced for the Deutsche Reichsbahn.

This class was procured as part of the German Nazi party's preparations for war that led into the Second World War. Up to 1948, 3,164 Class 50 engines were built by almost all the European locomotive factories – towards the end as so-called provisional war locomotives (Übergangskriegslokomotiven) and classified as 50 ÜK.

At the end of the steam locomotive era, they became virtually a universal class of mixed-traffic steam engine that, thanks to their low axle load, could even be employed on branch lines with light track beds. The Deutsche Bundesbahn grouped the locomotives into Classes 050, 051, 052 and 053 from 1968 so that the numbers were computer-compatible.

Some of the class were used by the Polish State Railways as type Ty5.

General 

In spite of wartime losses, a large number of engines still remained in 1945. No fewer than 2,159 working locomotives were taken over by the Deutsche Bundesbahn alone and, for a long time, they formed the backbone of goods traffic operations together with the larger DRG Class 44. They were also used for passenger services.

To protect the engine crew when running in reverse, the front of the tender (a 2'2' T 26) was furnished with a protective shield. On many locomotives the Wagner smoke deflectors were replaced by the Witte model after the war. On 735 of the DB machines the tender was fitted with a conductor's cab, which meant that the volume of the coal bunker had to be reduced.

1452 locomotives were included in the new DB classification scheme. That said, 88 of them were already earmarked for withdrawal. Because the class number now had to consist of 3 figures, the designations 051, 052 and 053 had to be introduced in addition to 050.

As a result, the old Class 50 was divided as shown in the table:

The last DB locomotives were retired from Duisburg-Wedau in 1977.

Only 350 examples of Class 50 engines remained in with the DR in East Germany after the war. Because only a small number of the numerous Class 44 fleet went to East Germany, the DRB Class 52 was the predominant goods train locomotive in many areas there. Of the Class 50s, 208 units were rebuilt into Class 50.35-37 engines. The original locomotives ran mainly in the south. From the middle of the 1970s they were retired in large numbers, so that in the 1980s they were real rarities. Nevertheless, the last ones ended their active duties in 1987 together with the rebuilds (Rekoloks).

Some of the original locomotives are preserved, including 50 622 and 50 849. No. 50 622 is stabled in the Nuremberg Transport Museum, where, on the evening of 17 October 2005, it was badly damaged in the great fire at the locomotive shed. The engine should however be able to be repaired with the aid of donations. No. 50 849 belongs to the Glauchau Railway Society (Eisenbahnverein Glauchau) and has a Wagner smoke deflector.

After the Second World War many examples of Class 50 engines were left in the other European states and some were used until the end of the steam traction era. For example, they were in service with the PKP (55 redesignated PKP class Ty5), the ČSD (28 redesignated class 555.1), the ÖBB and the DSB.

DB Class 50.40 

Because the Deutsche Bundesbahn had sufficient goods train locomotives, they could quickly phase out the DRB Class 52 engines, so that the ageing boilers on the Class 50s could be replaced by those of the Class 52s. Even the trough tender of the Kriegslokomotiven was used by the 50s amongst others. In the 1950s, several Class 50 locomotives served as trials engines. Thus 35 machines were given a boiler with mixer preheater and turbo feed pumps. Number 50 1503 was experimentally equipped with a Giesl ejector. In 1959 ten locomotives were given a boiler with smaller grate area in order to try to reduce the consumption of coal.

After experience with Franco-Crosti boilers on Class 52 locomotives (DB Class 42.90), Henschel rebuilt number 50 1412 in 1954 with such a boiler. This included a second preheater boiler underneath the actual locomotive boiler itself. After the smoke gases had flowed through the main boiler, they were turned around and passed through the preheater boiler. They escaped into the atmosphere through a side chimney along with the exhaust steam. The feed water was initially heated in a surface or mixer preheater, then in the preheater boiler before entering the main boiler. In this way the heat energy of the combustion gases could be better utilised and fuel consumption reduced. In 1958, 30 more engines were given Franco-Crosti smoke gas preheaters. These locos were redesignated as 50 4001 to 50 4031. Number 50 4011 was given oil firing. It was deployed in Münsterland and in the Rhineland. The locomotives were retired by 1967.

Adolph Giesl-Gieslingen describes in his book „Anatomie der Dampflokomotive“ that the Sulfuric acid in the smoke condensed in the preheater and attacked the Heat exchanger. The conversion to Diesel and Electric locos led Italy and Germany both to abandon development of the Franco Crosti smoke pre-heater.

No locomotive was preserved.

DR Class 50.35-37 

At the end of the 1930s, it was thought that a suitable boiler material had been found, in the form of St 47 K-Mo steel, that would allow boiler pressure to be increased to 20 bar without significantly raising the total weight of the boiler. The newly developed steel had a higher strength than the type of steel (St 34) used hitherto, but its disadvantage was that it had considerably worse conductivity. In the harsh everyday work of steam locomotives the material became very quickly fatigued, so that boilers made of the new steel had to be replaced after only a few years. The Class 50, too, was given such a boiler to begin with. Even though its condition was less critical than with other classes, it urgently needed replacing by the end of the 1950s. As a result, the DR in East Germany had the 50E  replacement boiler developed on the basis of the new boilers equipping the Class 23.10 / 50.40, although because the locomotive frames were different it was given a 500 mm longer boiler barrel. This was later used on the rebuilds (the so-called Rekoloks), which saw the conversion of Class 23 engines, as well as conversions of the Class 52s into 52.80s and the Class 58s into 58.30s. Between 1958 and 1962, 208 Class 50 locomotives were given such a boiler, along with a mixer preheater, a larger radiative heating area and improved suction draught, which also raised its performance. Many engines were also equipped with Giesl ejectors. These Reko locomotives were allocated to sub-class 50.35 and given operating numbers 50 3501 to 50 3708. In their last years of operation these engines often ran with the new 2'2' T 28 tenders.

The engines were soon gathered together in the railway divisions of the northwest. After the conversion of engines to oil-fired Class 50.50, the remaining coal-fired ones were concentrated in the Magdeburg division. Replacing older locomotives as well as oil-fired ones, they returned to the Dresden and Schwerin divisions again by the end of the 1970s.

The last regular standard gauge steam train was hauled by a Class 50.35 locomotive. This was number 50 3559, which headed an official farewell service on 29 October 1988 on a round trip from Halberstadt to Magdeburg, Thale and back to Halberstadt. No. 50 3559 is used in Liblar as a restaurant.

There are several Class 50.35 locomotives, several of them still working, belonging to Deutsche Bahn AG and the many  museum railways and railway museums, such as numbers 50 3501, 50 3539, 50 3564, 50 3576, 50 3616, 50 3648, 50 3654, 50 3695 and 50 3708.

DR Class 50.50 
Between 1966 and 1971, 72 Class 50.35  locomotives were converted to oil-firing. To distinguish them, they were re-designated as Class 50.50. From the introduction of EDP numbers in 1970 they were given operating numbers 50 0001 to 50 0072. They were stationed in the Reichsbahn divisions of Schwerin and Greifswald and used for heavy goods train duties. Their sudden withdrawal in 1981 was a political decision as a result of the cost of crude oil prices in the Eastern Bloc which had suddenly risen sharply. This meant that they could now chemically process Bunker oil D; with the result that it was not longer available for locomotive firing.

In the Bavarian Railway Museum (Bayerischen Eisenbahnmuseum) in Nördlingen the last representative of this class, number 50 0072, is preserved.

DR Class 50.40 

As well as modern passenger train locomotives, the DR in East Germany needed  more goods train locomotives with a 15 t axle load. As a result, a parallel development, like those of the pre-war time, was initiated for a passenger train engine, the DR Class 23.10, and a goods train engine, the DR Class 50.40, in order that many of their components could be interchangeable. The running gear conformed broadly to that of the Einheitslok, but a plate frame had to be used, because bar frames could no longer be worked. The boiler was a new build to modern construction standards with a combustion chamber and a mixer preheater. In terms of performance it was roughly comparable to the standard boiler, but was somewhat more economic in its fuel consumption. The locomotives were also given new tenders, the 2'2' T 28. The 88 engines, which were renumbered from 50 4001 to 50 4088, were delivered between 1956 and 1960. Number 50 4088 was therefore the last standard gauge steam engine to be newly built in Germany. They were permanently stationed on the routes over the plains in the northern railway divisions. Because the plate frame soon proved to be the weakest link (with a high repair bill), the locos were taken out of traction service by 1980, but continued to be used as heating engines.

The Bavarian Railway Museum (Bayerische Eisenbahnmuseum) in Nördlingen has acquired the last preserved engine of this type, number 50 4073. It is currently in the Meiningen Steam Locomotive Works at and is awaiting external refurbishment.

Other railway companies 

After the Second World War several Class 50 locomotives were left in eastern Europe, where some of the railway administrations procured more of them. For example, the Romanian State Railway CFR produced 282 copies of Class 50 locomotives between 1947 and 1959. 40 Romanian 150s were supplied to China in 1958, became class DK5 in 1959 and were numbered 241–280. DK5-250 is preserved at the Shenyang Railway Museum. Some were also supplied to the Korean State Railway in North Korea, where they were numbered in the 150 series.

See also
 List of DRG locomotives and railbuses

Footnotes

References

External links 

Photos of a typical original Class 50: 50 1002
  50 2988

50
2-10-0 locomotives
50
Railway locomotives introduced in 1939
Freight locomotives
Passenger locomotives
Standard gauge locomotives of Germany
Steam locomotives of China
Locomotives of North Korea
1′E h2 locomotives
Henschel locomotives
Borsig locomotives
Krupp locomotives
Krauss-Maffei locomotives
Floridsdorf locomotives
Berliner locomotives
Orenstein & Koppel locomotives
Arnold Jung locomotives
Škoda locomotives
Esslingen locomotives
ČKD locomotives
Cockerill locomotives
Franco-Belge locomotives